Toshi is a masculine Japanese given name. It is also a nickname or shortening of several longer names.

Possible writings
Toshi can be expressed with several kanji characters. Some examples:

敏, "agile"
俊, "talented"
利, "benefit"
年, "year"
慧, "wise"

The name can also be written in hiragana とし or katakana トシ.

Notable people with the name
, Japanese rower.
, Japanese composer.
, Japanese rower.
, American musician.

Other people
Toshi Reagon (born 1964), American female folk/blues musician
Toshi Sabri, Indian singer and composer
Toshi Seeger (1922–2013), American filmmaker, producer and environmental activist
Toshi Sinha, Indian voice actress

Fictional characters
Toshi (トシ), a character in the film Moon Child
Toshi Tsukikage (月影 トシ), a character in the anime series Soar High! Isami
Toshi Yoshida (トシ・ヨシダ), a character in the television series American Dad!

See also
, Japanese printmaker

Japanese masculine given names